For the city named Bento Gonçalves in Brazil, see Bento Gonçalves, Rio Grande do Sul

Bento António Gonçalves, GOL (2 March 1902 – 11 September 1942) was the second General Secretary of the Portuguese Communist Party. He was born in Montalegre, Vila Real District, in the North of Portugal. Not much is known about his childhood. In 1915 he became an apprentice mechanical turner in Lisbon. Four years later, in 1919 he started doing the same work in the arsenal of the Portuguese navy in Alfeite. 

In 1922 he joined the navy and one year later he started the elementary pilot course. In 1924 he was sent to the Portuguese colony of Angola and started to work as a mechanical turner in the Luanda railroad company. He became there an activist, trying to organize the Union of the Luanda's Workers. 

In 1926 he returned to Lisbon, where he became a member of the Navy Workers Labor Union, in the next year he traveled to Moscow, in the Portuguese delegation to the celebration of the 10th anniversary of the Bolshevik Revolution. 

In September 1928 he joined the Portuguese Communist Party and became a member of the cell of the Arsenal of Alfeite. In 1929 he participated in the reorganizative conference of the Communist Party and was elected to the provisional Central Commission. Soon after, he became Secretary General. 

In 1930 he was arrested by the political police of the Estado Novo regime and was forced to live in the Azores. One year later he was transferred to Portuguese Cape Verde. In 1933 he returned to Portugal and went underground. In November of the same year he traveled to Madrid where he established contacts with the Comintern and the Communist Party of Spain. 

In 1935, Bento Gonçalves participated in the 7th Congress of the Comintern. Soon after returning to Portugal he was arrested again by the political police. After that he was transferred to a prison in the Azores where he was put on trial by a military court for his communist activities. In the end of the year he was transferred to the prison camp in Tarrafal, where he died of sickness in 1942.

In the Avante! Festival of 2002, the Communist Party carried out an exposition in the central pavilion about his work and life.

References 

1902 births
1942 deaths
People from Montalegre
Portuguese Communist Party politicians
Portuguese anti-fascists
20th-century Portuguese politicians